Elberta is an unincorporated community and census-designated place (CDP) in Blair County, Pennsylvania, United States. It was first listed as a CDP prior to the 2020 census.

The CDP is in central Blair County, in the southern end of Tyrone Township. It is at the headwaters of Sinking Run, in a valley between two arms of Brush Mountain. Sinking Run flows northeast into Sinking Valley and joins the Little Juniata River at the northeastern end of Tyrone Township.

Kettle Road is the only through road in Elberta. It leads west through the Kettle Creek water gap in Brush Mountain  to Altoona, while to the northeast it leads  through Sinking Valley to Pennsylvania Route 453.

Demographics

References 

Census-designated places in Blair County, Pennsylvania
Census-designated places in Pennsylvania